The Ildefonso Altarpiece is a triptych painting by Peter Paul Rubens, dating to between 1630 and 1631. It is now in the Kunsthistorisches Museum, in Vienna.

It is named after the central panel, which shows Saint Ildefonsus's vision of the Virgin Mary, in which she gave him a casula. On the side panels are Isabella Clara Eugenia and Albert VII, regents of the Spanish Netherlands, with their patron saints Albert  and Elisabeth of Hungary. Albert had founded the Ildefonso Brotherhood in the church of Saint Jacques-sur-Coudenberg in Brussels, to encourage loyalty to the Habsburg dynasty - the altarpiece was commissioned for the Brotherhood by his widow shortly after his death.

Notes

External links
Catalogue entry

Paintings in the collection of the Kunsthistorisches Museum
1631 paintings
Paintings by Peter Paul Rubens
Paintings of the Virgin Mary